Vestmannaeyjar (sometimes anglicized as Westman Islands) is a municipality and archipelago off the south coast of Iceland.

The largest island, Heimaey, has a population of 4,414, most of whom live in the archipelago's main town, Vestmannaeyjabær. The other islands are uninhabited, although six have single hunting cabins. Vestmannaeyjar came to international attention in 1973 with the eruption of Eldfell volcano, which destroyed many buildings and forced a month-long evacuation of the entire population to mainland Iceland. Approximately one-fifth of the town was destroyed before the lava flow was halted by application of 6.8billion litres of cold sea water.

Geography

The Vestmannaeyjar archipelago is young in geological terms. The islands lie in the Southern Icelandic Volcanic Zone and have been formed by eruptions over the past 10,000–12,000 years. The volcanic system consists of 70–80 volcanoes both above and below the sea.

Vestmannaeyjar comprises the following islands:

Heimaey
Surtsey
Elliðaey
Bjarnarey
Álsey
Suðurey
Brandur
Hellisey
Súlnasker
Geldungur
Geirfuglasker
the islands Hani , Hæna , Hrauney  and the skerry Grasleysa  are called Smáeyjar (small islands).

Total: 

There are 15 islands, and about 30 rock stacks and skerries. All the islands have been built up in submarine eruptions and consist of alternating layers of palagonite tuff and lava. The oldest geological formations are in the northern part of Heimaey ("Home Island"), the largest island and the only inhabited one. Basalt columns can be seen in many places, and the sea has eroded the soft rock of the shoreline and scooped out many picturesque coves and grottos, which are among the special features of the islands.

There was a submarine eruption southeast of Hellisey in 1896. The next eruption began on 14 November 1963. It lasted about four years – one of the longest in Icelandic history – and gave birth to Surtsey, the 15th island in the group.

Biodiversity

There is generally very little snow, but a lot of rain. Owing to this microclimate, returning migrant birds are often first seen in the spring and they set out from the islands in the autumn. All of Iceland's seabirds can be found in Vestmannaeyjar: the guillemot, gannet, kittiwake, Iceland gull, and puffin. The puffin is the most plentiful species and is the Vestmannaeyjar emblem. More than 30 species of birds nest in their millions in the cliffs and grassy ledges, and other species make irregular appearances.

There are about 150 plant species in the flora of the islands, and about 80 types of insect have been identified.
The waters around the Vestmannaeyjar contain some of the North Atlantic's richest fishing grounds. The two main commercially exploited species in Iceland, cod and haddock, are found in abundance in Vestmannaeyjar. Other species, such as flat-fish, herring and capelin, are also commonly harvested as they migrate through the area in the autumn and winter. Lobsters and ocean perch are found in large numbers in the deep water to the southeast of the islands. Seals, small types of whale and other marine species are also present in large numbers around the islands.

The townspeople have a tradition of guiding stray puffins to safe locations.

Climate

With extremely high precipitation considering the latitude, Vestmannaeyjar features a subpolar oceanic climate (Cfc) under the Köppen climate classification. It is often very windy in the islands, and the highest wind speed measured in Iceland was recorded in Stórhöfði. The main wind directions are easterly and south-easterly. The islands enjoy the country's highest average annual temperature, the Gulf Stream having a strong warming effect, especially in winter.

History and name

The islands are named after Gaels who had been captured into slavery by Norsemen. The Old Norse word Vestmenn, literally "Westmen", was applied to the Irish, and retained in Icelandic even though Iceland is further west than Ireland. (In contrast, the Norse Gaels often called themselves Ostmen or Austmenn – "East-men".)

Not long after Ingólfur Arnarson arrived in Iceland, his blood brother Hjörleifur was murdered by the slaves he had brought with him. Ingólfur tracked them down to the Vestmannaeyjar and killed them all in retribution, hence the name Vestmannaeyjar (the islands of the west men). This is speculated to have occurred in AD 875.

On 16 July 1627, in an event known as the Turkish Abductions, the islands were captured by a fleet of three ships of Barbary Pirates from Algiers, who stayed there until 19 July under the control of Ottomans. They had earlier raided the east of Iceland and Murat Reis from Salé in Morocco had commanded another raid in Grindavík in June of that year. The pirates captured 234 people from the islands and took them on a 27-day voyage to Algiers, where most of them spent the rest of their lives in bondage. One of the captives, Lutheran minister Ólafur Egilsson, managed to return in 1628 and wrote a book about his experience. In 1636, ransom was paid for 34 of the captives, and most of them returned to Iceland. After this, a small fort was built on Skansinn (that is, "the bastion"), and an armed guard was established to keep watch from the mountain Helgafell for the approach of ships.

For centuries, the people of the Vestmannaeyjar had a hard struggle for existence, living from fishing and wild birds and their eggs, which they gathered in the cliffs and rock stacks offshore. At the end of the 19th century, when the population was about 600, great changes took place in the lifestyle of the islanders. In 1904, the first motorised boat was purchased, and more followed soon afterwards. By 1930, the population had risen to 3,470. The Vestmannaeyjar have always been at the forefront of developments in fishing and sea food processing, and are the most productive fishing centre in the country. Shortage of fresh water was also a problem for a long time, but a great improvement took place in 1968 when a pipeline was laid.

The area is very volcanically active, like the rest of Iceland. There were two major eruptions in the 20th century: the eruption in 1963 that created the new island of Surtsey, and the Eldfell eruption of January 1973, which created a 200-metre-high mountain where a meadow had been, and caused the island's 5,000 inhabitants to be temporarily evacuated to the mainland.

In 2000, Heimaey stave church, a replica of the Haltdalen Stave Church containing a replica of the St Olav frontal, was erected at Skansinn as a gift from the Norwegian government to Iceland, commemorating the conversion of Iceland to Christianity a thousand years before.

Transportation
A ferry service runs from Landeyjahöfn (closer) and sometimes under bad conditions Þorlákshöfn (further away). Flights to /from Vestmannaeyjar Airport connect the largest island with the rest of Iceland, making 5-6 roundtrips per day. A hybrid electric ferry with a 3 MWh battery and capacity for 550 passengers and 75 cars started operating the 13 km route in July 2019. It uses 100 MWh per week, replacing 35 tonnes of fuel. In bad weather, the longer route to Þorlákshöfn requires fuel.

Popular culture

Festival
The islands are famed in Iceland for their major annual festival, Þjóðhátíð ("The National Festival"), which attracts thousands of people. The festival was first held in 1874, at the same time as the commemoration of the millennium of the settlement of Iceland. Vestmannaeyjar residents had been prevented by bad weather from sailing to the mainland for the festivities and thus celebrated locally.

Film
From 1998 to 2003 the island of Heimaey was home to Keiko the killer whale, star of Free Willy (1993).
The film The Deep (2012), based on true events, is set on and around the island.

Literature
 The islands and their history of volcanic activity play a major role in James Rollins' seventh Sigma Force novel, The Devil Colony (2011).
 The islands feature as the primary location in Yrsa Sigurðardóttir's novel Ashes to Dust, which uses the 1973 eruption of Eldfell as a key element in the plot.

Sport
ÍBV, based on Vestmannaeyjar, are one of the most prominent sports clubs in Iceland, having won several national championships and national cups in both handball and football.

The Westman Islands Golf Club was established in 1938 and is located in the remnants of an extinct volcano. Golf Monthly ranks it as one of the top 200 golf courses in Europe.

Notable people

 Ásgeir Sigurvinsson (born 1955), retired footballer, was born in Vestmannaeyjar and started his career at ÍBV
 Bergur Elías Ágústsson (born 1963), former mayor of Norðurþing, was born in Vestmannaeyjar
 Elísa Viðarsdóttir (born 1991), was born in Vestmannaeyjar and started her career at ÍBV
 Elsa Guðbjörg Vilmundardóttir (1932–2008), Iceland's first female geologist, was born in Vestmannaeyjar
 Fanndís Friðriksdóttir (born 1990), footballer from Vestmannaeyjar, training at ÍBV's youth programme
 Gísli Pálsson (born 1949), professor of anthropology, was born in Vestmannaeyjar
 Guðmundur Guðmundsson (1825–83), one of the first Mormon missionaries to preach in Iceland, preached in Vestmannaeyjar
 Guðmundur Torfason (born 1961), retired footballer, was born in Vestmannaeyjar
 Gunnar Heiðar Þorvaldsson (born 1982), footballer, was born in Vestmannaeyjar and has been signed to ÍBV on 3 occasions
 Halldóra Briem (1913–1993), the first Icelandic woman to study architecture, was born in Vestmannaeyjar
 Heimir Hallgrímsson (born 1967), manager of the Iceland national football team, was born in Vestmannaeyjar and has both played for and managed ÍBV teams on more than one occasions; he is still the dentist for the town
 Helgi Ólafsson (born 1956), chess grandmaster, is a native of Heimaey
 Hermann Hreiðarsson (born 1974), footballer, has been both player and player-manager at ÍBV
 Högna Sigurðardóttir (born 1929), architect, was born in Vestmannaeyjar
 Ívar Ingimarsson (born 1977), footballer and cousin of Gunnar Heiðar Þorvaldsson, played for ÍBV in 1998–99
 Júlíana Sveinsdóttir (1889–1966), painter and textile artist, was born in Vestmannaeyjar
 Kári Kristjánsson (born 1984), handball player, was born in Vestmannaeyjar
 Kolfinna Kristófersdóttir, model is originally from Vestmannaeyjar
 Marcellus de Niveriis OFM (died 1460 or 1462), bishop of Skálholt was master of the manor of Vestmannaeyjar
 Margrét Lára Viðarsdóttir (born 1986), retired footballer and is considered by many to be the best Icelandic female footballer of all times. Played for ÍBV, Valur and also played in Sweden and Germany. Scored 79 goals in 124 games for Iceland. Voted Icelandic athlete of the year 2007.
 Ólafur Egilsson (1564–1639), a Lutheran minister who, in 1627 with his wife and sons, was kidnapped in the Turkish Abduction, subsequently writing a memoir of his travels
 Sigurvin Ólafsson (born 1976), footballer, was born in Vestmannaeyjar and has twice been signed to ÍBV
 Smári McCarthy (born 1984), information activist and Icelandic Pirate Party MP, grew up in Vestmannaeyjar, his family having moved there when he was 9
 Sólveig Anspach (1960–2015), film director and screenwriter, was born in Vestmannaeyjar
 Tryggvi Guðmundsson (born 1974), footballer, was born in Vestmannaeyjar and started his career at ÍBV, returning there twice
 Þórarinn Ingi Valdimarsson (born 1990), footballer, was born in Vestmannaeyjar and started his career at ÍBV
 Þorsteinn Ingi Sigfússon (born 1954), award-winning physicist, was born in Vestmannaeyjar

See also
 Íþróttabandalag Vestmannaeyja (ÍBV)
 Geography of Iceland
 Iceland plume
 List of glaciers of Iceland
 List of lakes of Iceland
 List of islands of Iceland
 List of volcanoes in Iceland
 List of rivers of Iceland
 List of waterfalls of Iceland
 Volcanism of Iceland
 Framhaldsskólinn í Vestmannaeyjum

Notes

References

External links

Official website
Info website about Vestmannaeyjar
 Vestmannaeyjar in the Catalogue of Icelandic Volcanoes
Picture gallery from www.islandsmyndir.is
Heimaey (the volcano)
Travel site for Vestmannaeyjar
 Blog from Vestmannaeyjar
 Photos from Vestmannaeyjar

 
Municipalities of Iceland
Populated places in Southern Region (Iceland)
Islands of Iceland